Voralpsee is a lake above Grabs in the Canton of St. Gallen, Switzerland.

See also
List of mountain lakes of Switzerland

References

Lakes of Switzerland
Lakes of the canton of St. Gallen